Robert Walsingham, also Wallsingham, was a famous 17th-century English pirate who served with the Barbary States. He was the captain of a Turkish man-of-war, in which he finally sailed to Ireland to submit himself to the authorities. He was pardoned in 1621 by James I of England, together with Henry Mainwaring with whom he had collaborated, and was accepted into  the Royal Navy.

See also
 Anglo-Turkish piracy

Notes

English pirates
Year of death unknown
Year of birth unknown
English expatriates in the Ottoman Empire
Pardoned pirates